Omega Ursae Majoris (Omega UMa, ω Ursae Majoris, ω UMa) is the Bayer designation for a binary star system in the northern circumpolar constellation of Ursa Major. It is visible to the naked eye with an apparent visual magnitude of 4.61. Based upon an annual parallax shift of 13.24 mas, it is roughly 246 light years from the Sun. At that distance, the visual magnitude of the star is diminished by an extinction factor of 0.11 due to interstellar dust.

This is a single-lined spectroscopic binary star system with an orbital period of 15.8 days and an eccentricity of 0.31. The primary member, component A, is an A-type main sequence star with a stellar classification of A1VsSi:. The stellar spectrum has the appearance of a hot Am star, showing overabundances of many iron-peak and heavier elements, but an underabundance of helium. In particular, it has an abnormal abundance of silicon.

Naming

References

A-type main-sequence stars
Spectroscopic binaries
Ursa Major (constellation)
Ursae Majoris, Omega
Durchmusterung objects
Ursae Majoris, 45
094334
053295
4248